A metropolitan area or metro is a region consisting of a densely populated urban core and its less-populated surrounding territories under the same administrative division, sharing industry, infrastructure and housing.

Based on these faculties Chennai is the largest metropolitan area in Tamil Nadu.

List 
List is based on the concern cities data by Wikipedia.

See also
 Chennai
 Coimbatore
 List of urban agglomerations in Tamil Nadu
 Madurai
 Salem
 Tiruchirappalli
 Tiruppur

References 

 
Tamil Nadu-related lists